Ali Hariri or Sheikh Ahmed Bohtani (1009 in Harir – 1079/1080) was a Kurdish poet who wrote in Kurmanji and considered a pioneer in classical Kurdish Sufi literature and a founder of the Kurdish literary tradition.

Biography 
Hariri was born in 1009 in the village of Harir, part of the Hakkâri district of Bohtan. He was first mentioned by Ahmad Khani in the 17th century, and limited information is known about him. His poetry focused on love, love for Kurdistan, its beautiful nature and the beauty of its people. The poems were popular and spread all over Kurdistan. According to historian Muhibbî, Hariri moved to Damascus to study and had a son named Şex Ehmed (d. 1048) who possibly was a mullah and a faqih.

He died in Cizre and his grave is considered a sacred place and visited by numerous people every year.

See also 

 Melayê Cizîrî

References 

1009 births
1079 deaths
Kurdish poets

People from Erbil
Kurdish Sufis
11th-century Kurdish people